The 2018–19 High Point Panthers women's basketball team represents High Point University during the 2018–19 NCAA Division I women's basketball season. The Panthers, led by seventh-year head coach DeUnna Hendrix, play their home games at the Millis Athletic Convocation Center as members of the Big South Conference. They finished the season 22–9, 15–3 in Big South play to finish in second place. They lost in the quarterfinals of the Big South women's tournament to Charleston Southern. They received an automatic bid to the WNIT where they lost to Ohio in the first round

Previous season
The 2017-18 team finished the season 17–14, 10–8 in Big South play to finish in fourth place. They advanced to the semifinals of the Big South women's tournament where they lost 78-54 to eventual champion Liberty.

Off-season

Departures

Recruits

Transfers
note: Miya Bull and Bria Gibson are eligible for the 2018-19 season

Roster 
Reference:

Preseason Honors

For the second straight season, senior guard Emma Bockrath was voted the Big South Conference preseason player of the year. In 2017–18, Bockrath ranked first in the conference in steals per game in conference play (2.7), fifth in points (14.1), sixth in field goal percentage (43.2%), and seventh in rebounds (6.6). Longtime AAU teammate Shea Morgan was named to the All-Big South Second Team.

The Panthers were picked to finish second in the Big South Conference, behind Radford.

Schedule and results 

|-
!colspan=12 style=| Non-conference regular season

|-
!colspan=12 style=| Big South regular season

|-
!colspan=12 style=| Big South Conference tournament

|-
!colspan=12 style=| WNIT

Individual statistics
Reference:

Season highs

References

High Point Panthers women's basketball seasons
High Point
High Point
High Point
High Point